Second Street Bridge was a historic concrete Bowstring arch bridge located in Chester, Pennsylvania. The original patent issued to James B. Marsh in 1911, for the bridge design used, included the experimental use of concrete.

The bridge allowed traffic on Pennsylvania Route 291 to cross Chester Creek.    The bridge has been demolished.

It was listed on the National Register of Historic Places in 1988.

References 

Road bridges on the National Register of Historic Places in Pennsylvania
Bridges completed in 1919
Bridges in Delaware County, Pennsylvania
Chester, Pennsylvania
National Register of Historic Places in Delaware County, Pennsylvania
Concrete bridges in the United States
Tied arch bridges in the United States